Seth Benjamin Green (né Gesshel-Green; born February 8, 1974) is an American actor. His film debut came with a role in the comedy-drama film The Hotel New Hampshire (1984), and he went on to have supporting roles in comedy films throughout the 1980s, including Can't Buy Me Love (1987) and My Stepmother Is an Alien (1988). 

During the 1990s and 2000s, Green began starring in comedy films such as Can't Hardly Wait (1998), Rat Race, America's Sweethearts (both 2001), Scooby-Doo 2: Monsters Unleashed, and Without a Paddle (both 2004), and became known for his portrayal of Scott Evil, Dr. Evil's son, in the Austin Powers film series (1997–2002). Also during this time, he began taking more serious roles in action films, including Knockaround Guys (2001) and The Italian Job (2003). He has provided the voice for Howard the Duck in a number of Marvel Cinematic Universe films and series, including Guardians of the Galaxy (2014) and Guardians of the Galaxy Vol. 2 (2017). In 2019, he wrote, directed, and starred in the comedy-drama film Changeland.

Green's first lead role on television was on the ABC sitcom Good & Evil in 1991, for which he won a Young Artist Award. Green later gained attention for his supporting roles as Oz, a teenage guitarist and the boyfriend of Willow Rosenberg, on the fantasy television series Buffy the Vampire Slayer (1997–2000), and as the voice of Chris Griffin on the Fox adult animated sitcom Family Guy (1999–present). He also voiced Leonardo in the Nickelodeon animated series Teenage Mutant Ninja Turtles (2014–2017) and Joker in the Mass Effect video game series (2007–2012). Green created, directs, writes, and produces the adult animated comedy series Robot Chicken and its spinoffs (2005–present), which have earned him three Primetime Emmy Awards and five Annie Awards.

Early life
Seth Benjamin Gesshel-Green was born in Overbrook Park, Philadelphia, Pennsylvania, the son of Barbara (Gesshel) and Herbert Green. He has one sister, Kaela. Green later legally changed his name to Seth Benjamin Green. He was raised Jewish and had a Bar Mitzvah ceremony. His ancestors were from Russia, Poland, and Scotland. Green started acting at the age of 7. His early comic influences included Monty Python, Blackadder, Saturday Night Live, Richard Pryor, Bill Cosby, Porky's, and Caddyshack.

Career

Early work
Green's first movie roles were in the 1984 films Billions for Boris and The Hotel New Hampshire; the second film cast him alongside Jodie Foster and Rob Lowe. He appeared in the 1987 film Can't Buy Me Love, playing Patrick Dempsey's character's little brother, Chuckie Miller. He starred in Woody Allen's Radio Days (1987) as Joe (a 1930s–1940s boy based on Allen) and appeared in Big Business (1988) and, in the same year, My Stepmother Is an Alien, which also starred Buffy the Vampire Slayer co-star Alyson Hannigan.

In 1984, Green portrayed Carl "Alfalfa" Switzer in the Jell-O Gelatin Pops commercials featuring The Little Rascals. In 1991, Green rose to fame in a Rally's "Cha Ching" commercial, which earned him an appearance at a New Orleans Saints game. Green was given a key to New Orleans in honor of his role in the popular commercial. 

Green appeared in the horror TV series It (as Richie Tozier, age 12) and Ticks, all three Austin Powers movies (as Dr. Evil's son, Scott), and Enemy of the State and The Italian Job (as a computer specialist in both). He was also in the films Can't Hardly Wait, Rat Race, Scooby-Doo 2: Monsters Unleashed, Without a Paddle (alongside Matthew Lillard), Idle Hands, Party Monster, Airborne, and Old Dogs. Green also had a role in the series Buffy the Vampire Slayer.

In 1994, he starred alongside Jennifer Love Hewitt in the short-lived series The Byrds of Paradise. He worked with Hewitt again in 1998's Can't Hardly Wait. Green is not related to Bruce Seth Green, who directed some episodes of Buffy the Vampire Slayer. On occasion, some sources confuse the two and have credited Seth as the director. As an actor in the series, he was close to co-star Alyson Hannigan because they were lovers in the show. He played Daniel "Oz" Osbourne, a calm, mild-mannered member of the band Dingoes Ate My Baby who gets turned into a werewolf. He is very popular among fans of the series. Green has starred on Fox's Greg the Bunny and guest-starred on The X-Files, That '70s Show, Will & Grace, MADtv, Reno 911!, Entourage, Grey's Anatomy, The Wonder Years, Heroes, The Facts of Life, The Drew Carey Show, and My Name Is Earl.

Family Guy

Green provides the voice of Chris for the animated television sitcom  Family Guy. Green primarily voices Chris Griffin, the teenage son, who is overweight, unintelligent and, in many respects, a younger version of his father, and Neil Goldman, a neighbor of the Griffins. Green did an impression of the Buffalo Bill character from the thriller film The Silence of the Lambs during his audition. Green has stated that his main inspiration for Chris' voice came from envisioning how "Buffalo Bill" would sound if he were speaking through a PA system at a McDonald's.

Howard the Duck
Green provides the voice of Howard the Duck for the live-action Marvel Cinematic Universe (MCU) films Guardians of the Galaxy (2014) and Vol. 2 (2017) and the Disney+ animated series What If...?, as well as the Disney XD animated series Guardians of the Galaxy (2015–19) and Ultimate Spider-Man (2016). 

Developing the character with James Gunn, Green did an impression of Danny DeVito, "being sort of a gruff and cynical sarcastic character [who] doesn't know what the Earth species of duck even is and doesn't think of himself that way and is offended by that generalization."

Later work
Green is a co-creator, co-producer, writer, director, and most frequent voice of the Emmy-winning stop-motion sketch parody comedy TV series Robot Chicken, for which he does many voices and has appeared in animated form. Green is friends with the band Fall Out Boy, making a cameo in their music video, "This Ain't a Scene, It's an Arms Race". He also appeared in "Weird Al" Yankovic's "White & Nerdy" music video. He made two appearances on The Soup in 2007 and 2008, using his first appearance to lampoon Internet celebrity Chris Crocker. He voiced the character Jeff "Joker" Moreau, pilot of the Normandy-SR starship series in the video games Mass Effect, Mass Effect 2, and Mass Effect 3. He is a producer of The 1 Second Film and appears in the "making of" documentary that accompanies its feature-length credits. Green is also the co-creator (with Hugh Sterbakov) of the comic Freshmen, published by Top Cow Productions.

Green, along with Robot Chicken co-producer Breckin Meyer, appeared in the NBC show Heroes during the 2008–09 season. In January 2009, Green worked with David Faustino (Bud Bundy from Married... with Children) for an episode of Faustino's show Star-ving – Faustino is often mistaken for Green. Later in the same year, he worked with one of his idols, Robin Williams in comedy film Old Dogs, which also starred John Travolta. On July 13, World Wrestling Entertainment's official website announced Green as the special guest host for the July 13 episode of WWE Raw, and on that night, Green competed in the main event, a six-man tag team match, which his team won by disqualification. He was also in attendance for WWE's biggest event of the year, WrestleMania XXVI on March 28, 2010. Green guest-starred in the third season of the acclaimed sitcom Husbands. Green became the new voice of Leonardo in Teenage Mutant Ninja Turtles beginning in its third season (following Jason Biggs' departure from the role).

In 2019, he wrote and released his first movie named Changeland, starring Brenda Song and Macaulay Culkin. The movie was released on June 7, 2019.

In 2021, Green reprised the role of Todo 360 in Star Wars: The Bad Batch.

In 2022, Green voiced Thunderbolt in season three of Stargirl where the character was previously voiced by Jim Gaffigan.

Personal life
After getting engaged on New Year's Eve in 2009, Green married actress Clare Grant on May 1, 2010, in Northern California. They worked together on Robot Chicken, Warren the Ape, Changeland, Holidays, Star Wars: The Clone Wars, Hulk and the Agents of S.M.A.S.H., and her Saber and "Geek and Gamer Girls Song" viral videos.

In 2000, Green stated, "God is, to me, pretty much an idea. God is, to me, pretty much a myth created over time to deny the idea that we're all responsible for our own actions." In 2013, he said that he had "a deep belief in the divinity of the Universe, and I had no ability to really comprehend the scope or magnitude of all the things that I don't understand".

Filmography

Film

Television

Web

Video games

Theme park attractions

Awards and nominations

See also
 List of recurring That '70s Show characters

References

External links

 
 

1974 births
20th-century American male actors
21st-century American male actors
American male child actors
American male comedians
American male television actors
American male video game actors
American male voice actors
American sketch comedians
American television directors
American parodists
Living people
Male actors from Philadelphia
Male motion capture actors
Primetime Emmy Award winners
Jewish American male actors
21st-century American Jews